The exact role of Mycoplasma hominis (and to a lesser extent Ureaplasma) in regards to a number of conditions related to pregnant women and their (unborn) offspring is controversial. This is mainly because many healthy adults have genitourinary colonization with Mycoplasma, published studies on pathogenicity have important design limitations and the organisms are very difficult to detect. The likelihood of colonization with M. hominis appears directly linked to the number of lifetime sexual partners
Neonatal colonization does occur, but only through normal vaginal delivery. Caesarean section appears protective against colonization and is much less common. Neonatal colonization is transient.

Signs and symptoms

Those with urogenital or extragenital infections caused by M. hominis have symptoms similar to other sexually transmitted infections and its presence cannot be determined by its symptoms. The precise role this organism plays in causing disease remains speculative. Diagnosis remains a challenge because the organism is difficult to culture in vitro.  PCR-based techniques are still rare outside research scenarios.
The following conditions have been linked to Mycoplasma hominis:

 pyelonephritis
 cystitis
 Pelvic inflammatory disease (PID)
 endometritis
 chorioamnionitis
 surgical and nonsurgical wound infections
 bacteremia
 pneumonia
 meningitis
 salpingitis
 urethritis
 septic arthritis
 cervicitis

Mycoplasma hominis is often present in polymicrobial infections.

Diagnosis

Prevention 
If symptomatic, testing is recommended. The risk of contracting Mycoplasma infection can be reduced by the following:
 Using barrier methods such as condoms
 Seeking medical attention if you are experiencing symptoms suggesting a sexually transmitted infection.
 Seeking medical attention after learning that a current or former sex partner has, or might have had a sexually transmitted infection.
 Getting a STI history from your current partner and insisting they be tested and treated before intercourse.
 Avoiding vaginal activity, particularly intercourse, after the end of a pregnancy (delivery, miscarriage, or abortion) or certain gynecological procedures, to ensure that the cervix closes.
 Abstinence

Treatment
Mycoplasmas have a triple-layered membrane and lack a cell wall. Therefore, mycoplasmas are not affected by penicillins and other antibiotics that interfere with the cell wall synthesis. The growth of mycoplasmas in their host is inhibited by other broad-spectrum antibiotics. These broad-spectrum antibiotics inhibit the multiplication of the mycoplasma but does not kill them. Tetracyclines, macrolides, ketolides, quinolones are used to treat mycoplasma infections. In addition to the penicillins, mycoplasmas are resistant to rifampicin. Mycoplasmas may be difficult to eradicate from human or animal hosts or from cell cultures by antibiotic treatment because of resistance to the antibiotic, or because it does not kill the mycoplasma cell. Mycoplasma cells are able to invade the cells of their hosts.

Neonatal infection
Neonates, especially if preterm, are susceptible to M. hominis infection.
Meningoencephalitis in neonates has been described and M. hominis may be a significant causative agent of neonatal sepsis or meningitis.
M. hominis has been associated with chorioamnionits. M. hominis is associated with miscarriage.

References

 Using Wikipedia for Research

External links 

Sexually transmitted diseases and infections
Sexual health
Women's health
Infections with a predominantly sexual mode of transmission